Language School "Dr. Petar Beron"  is a secondary school in Kyustendil, Bulgaria, established in 1989. It educates students in English, German and Spanish. The educational process lasts 5 years (8-12 grades). It is situated in a baroque building, originally built for a hunting lodge of Ferdinand I of Bulgaria in 1904.

The school is named after 19th century Bulgarian educator Petar Beron.

Language schools
Schools in Bulgaria
Kyustendil
Educational institutions established in 1989
1989 establishments in Bulgaria